Erodium glandulosum, called the black-eyed heron's bill, is a species of flowering plant in the genus Erodium, native to the Pyrenees. It has gained the Royal Horticultural Society's Award of Garden Merit.

Subtaxa
The following subspecies are currently accepted:
Erodium glandulosum subsp. glandulosum
Erodium glandulosum subsp. paularense (Fern.Gonz. & Izco) Guitt.

References

glandulosum
Flora of the Pyrenees
Garden plants of Europe
Plants described in 1800 
Taxa named by Antonio José Cavanilles